Irving Edward Carlyle (September 20, 1896 – June 6, 1971) was an American lawyer and politician.

Early life 
Irving E. Carlyle was born on September 20, 1896 in Wake Forest, North Carolina, United States to John Bethune Carlyle and Dora Dunn Carlyle. His father was a professor at Wake Forest College.

Carlyle attended Wake Forest College. While was there he played baseball and basketball and managed the football team. He majored in French and German, and graduated with a Bachelor of Arts summa cum laude in 1917. After having taken a six-week quiz course on law at Wake Forest College, Carlyle passed the North Carolina State Bar in 1920.

In 1928 Carlyle married Mary Belo Moore.

Political career 
In 1961 North Carolina Governor Terry Sanford appointed a Governor's Commission on Education Beyond the High School with Carlyle as its chairman. Commonly referred to as the "Carlyle Commission", the body produced a set of proposals in August 1962 aimed at increasing college enrollment in North Carolina. One of its recommendations was the consolidation of the state's "public junior colleges" and "industrial education centers" under a single system of community colleges. In May 1963 the General Assembly responded by creating a Department of Community Colleges under the State Board of Education.

Over time Carlyle came to be opposed to American involvement in the Vietnam War and served as cochairman of the North Carolina Committee to End the War in Indochina until his death.

In April 1971 Carlyle criticized the death penalty before the General Assembly, arguing that "Only the poor and uneducated blacks and occasionally a poor white are ever put to death by the state" and that thus the death penalty existed only "to keep the blacks in check."

Later life 
Carlyle died from a heart attack early in the morning on June 6, 1971 at his desk in his home in Winston-Salem while working on a speech about the University of North Carolina. He was buried in Salem Cemetery.

References

Works cited 
 
 

1896 births
1971 deaths
North Carolina Democrats